Jonathan Mills (born 12 February 1984) is a Welsh rugby union player. A lock forward, he previously played for Llandovery RFC Bath, Llanelli RFC and the Scarlets before joining London Welsh where he captained the side winning the RFU Championship. In June 2013 he joined Sale Sharks.  In August 2017 Mills joined London Scottish as a player-coach until February 2018 where he will join the Dallas Griffins for the inaugural Major League Rugby season in the US as a player-coach.

Mills has represented Wales at under-16, under-18, under-19 and under-21 levels winning age group championships. He has also represented the Barbarians.

References

External links
 London Welsh profile

Welsh rugby union players
Llandovery RFC players
Llanelli RFC players
Scarlets players
Bath Rugby players
1984 births
Living people
Rugby union locks